Fullarton is an area in Irvine, North Ayrshire, Scotland.

Fullarton may also refer to:

Places
 Fullarton Township, Ontario, Canada
 Fullarton, South Australia
 Crosbie Castle and the Fullarton estate, South Ayrshire, Scotland
 Fullarton, a neighbourhood in Tollcross, Glasgow, Scotland
 Fullarton Park, football ground, home to Vale of Clyde F.C.

Surname
 Jamie Fullarton (born 1974), Scottish professional football player and manager
 John Fullarton (c.1645 – 1727), Scottish clergyman and nonjurant Episcopal Bishop of Edinburgh
 John Fullarton (writer) (c. 1780 – 1849), Scottish traveller and writer
 Tom Fullarton (born 1999), Australian professional basketball and football player
 William Fullarton (footballer) (1882–?), Scottish football player
 William Fullarton (priest) (died 1655), Archdeacon of Armagh

Other uses
 Archibald Fullarton and Co., a publisher in Glasgow in the 1800s
 The Fullarton, a theatre in Castle Douglas, Dumfries and Galloway, Scotland
 Fullarton Road, Adelaide, South Australia
 RAF Fullarton, a former Royal Air Force Ground Control Intercept station, Ayrshire, Scotland

See also
 Fullerton (disambiguation)